Rimu, originally known as Upper Woodstock, is a small town in the Westland District of New Zealand's South Island.

It is immediately south of Woodstock. It is named for the native tree Dacrydium cupressinum—with the common name "rimu"—that was once prevalent in the area. Rimu was founded in the 1800s and grew rapidly when gold was found in 1882 west of the town. In 1890, gold was discovered east of Rimu. These were New Zealand's last gold rushes.

Around 1900, Rimu had a school, two banks, two hotels, two churches, two butcheries, four stores, a post office, and a library.

References

Westland District
Populated places in the West Coast, New Zealand